Michael Moseley (born 13 November 1960) is an Australian former rugby league footballer who played in the 1980s. He played for the Parramatta Eels and was a member of the 1986 premiership winning team.

Career
Moseley made his debut for Parramatta during the 1983 season against Newtown, but only played in one other game for the season and was not a part of the 1983 premiership winning team.  In the 1986 grand final, Moseley pulled off a try-saving tackle with only seconds remaining to deny Canterbury victory.  Parramatta won the game 4–2, in a tryless grand final.  Moseley stayed with Parramatta until the 1989 season, and then retired from rugby league after being released by the club.
In 1990, Moseley was made a life member of the Parramatta club.

References

1960 births
Living people
Australian rugby league players
Parramatta Eels players
Rugby league hookers
Rugby league players from Sydney